Paddy's Lake is a lake in the Trent River and Lake Ontario drainage basins in the township of Limerick, Hastings County, Ontario, Canada, about  southeast of the community Murphy Corners,  west of Ontario Highway 62 and  south of the town of Bancroft.

Hydrology
The primary inflow, at the southwest is Mud Creek, and there is an unnamed creek inflow at the south. The primary outflow, at the east, is also Mud Creek, which flows to Steenburg Lake, and then via  Bass Creek, Beaver Creek, the Crowe River and the Trent River to the Bay of Quinte on Lake Ontario at Trenton.

See also
List of lakes in Ontario

References

Lakes of Hastings County